Amy Jade Winehouse (14 September 1983 – 23 July 2011) was an English singer and songwriter. She was known for her deep, expressive contralto vocals and her eclectic mix of musical genres, including soul, rhythm and blues and jazz.

A member of the National Youth Jazz Orchestra during her youth, Winehouse signed to Simon Fuller's 19 Management in 2002 and soon recorded a number of songs before signing a publishing deal with EMI. She also formed a working relationship with producer Salaam Remi through these record publishers. Winehouse's debut album, Frank, was released in 2003. Many of the album's songs were influenced by jazz and, apart from two covers, were co-written by Winehouse. Frank was a critical success in the UK and was nominated for the Mercury Prize. The song "Stronger Than Me" won her the Ivor Novello Award for Best Contemporary Song from the British Academy of Songwriters, Composers, and Authors.

Winehouse released her follow-up album, Back to Black, in 2006, which went on to become an international success and one of the best-selling albums in UK history. At the 2007 Brit Awards it was nominated for British Album of the Year, and she received the award for British Female Solo Artist. The song "Rehab" won her a second Ivor Novello Award. At the 50th Grammy Awards in 2008, she won five awards, tying the then record for the most wins by a female artist in a single night and becoming the first British woman to win five Grammys, including three of the General Field "Big Four" Grammy Awards: Best New Artist, Record of the Year and Song of the Year (for "Rehab"), as well as Best Pop Vocal Album.

Winehouse struggled with substance abuse and addiction. She died of alcohol poisoning on 23 July 2011, at the age of 27. After her death, Back to Black briefly became the UK's best-selling album of the 21st century. VH1 ranked Winehouse 26th on their list of the 100 Greatest Women in Music.

Early life
Amy Jade Winehouse was born on 14 September 1983 at Chase Farm Hospital in Gordon Hill, Enfield, to Jewish parents. Her father, Mitchell "Mitch" Winehouse, was a window panel installer and taxi driver; her mother, Janis Winehouse (née Seaton), was a pharmacist. Her mother was diagnosed with multiple sclerosis in 2003. Winehouse's great-great-grandfather Harris Winehouse emigrated from Minsk, Belarus, to London in 1891. She had an older brother, Alex (born 1979). The family lived in London's Southgate area, where she attended Osidge Primary School and then secondary at Ashmole School. Winehouse attended a Jewish Sunday school while she was a child. During an interview following her rise to fame, she expressed her dismissal towards the school by saying that she used to beg her father to permit her not to go and that she learned nothing about being Jewish by going anyway. In the same interview, Winehouse said she only went to a synagogue once a year on Yom Kippur "out of respect".

Many of Winehouse's maternal uncles were professional jazz musicians. Amy's paternal grandmother, Cynthia, had been a singer and had dated the English jazz saxophonist Ronnie Scott. She and Amy's parents influenced Amy's interest in jazz. Her father, Mitch, often sang Frank Sinatra songs to her, and whenever she was chastised at school, she would sing "Fly Me to the Moon" before going up to the headmistress to be told off. Winehouse's parents separated when she was nine, and she lived with her mother in Whetstone, London and stayed with her father and his girlfriend in Hatfield Heath, Essex on weekends.

In 1992, her grandmother Cynthia suggested that Amy attend the Susi Earnshaw Theatre School, where she went on Saturdays to further her vocal education and to learn to tap dance. She attended the school for four years and founded a short-lived rap group called Sweet 'n' Sour, with Juliette Ashby, her childhood friend, before seeking full-time training at Sylvia Young Theatre School. Several years later it was reported that Winehouse had been expelled at 14 for "not applying herself" and also for piercing her nose, but these claims were denied by Sylvia Young: "She changed schools at 15...I've heard it said she was expelled; she wasn't. I'd never have expelled Amy." Mitch Winehouse also denied the claims. She attended the Mount School, Mill Hill and the BRIT School in Selhurst, Croydon, dropping out at age 16.

After toying around with her brother Alex's guitar, Winehouse bought her own guitar when she was 14 and began writing music shortly afterwards. Soon after she began working for a living, as an entertainment journalist for the World Entertainment News Network and also singing with local group the Bolsha Band. In July 2000, she became the featured female vocalist with the National Youth Jazz Orchestra. She was influenced by Sarah Vaughan and Dinah Washington, the latter of whom she was already listening to at home. Winehouse's best friend, soul singer Tyler James, sent her demo tape to an A&R person.

Career

2002–2005: Career beginnings and Frank

Winehouse was signed to Simon Fuller's 19 Management in 2002 and was paid £250 a week against future earnings. While being developed by the management company, Winehouse was kept as a recording industry secret, although she was a regular jazz standards singer at the Cobden Club. Her future A&R representative at Island, Darcus Beese, heard of her by accident when the manager of the Lewinson Brothers showed him some productions of his clients, which featured Winehouse as key vocalist. When he asked who the singer was, the manager told him he was not allowed to say. Having decided that he wanted to sign her, it took several months of asking around for Beese to eventually discover who the singer was. However, Winehouse had already recorded a number of songs and signed a publishing deal with EMI by this time. Incidentally, she formed a working relationship with producer Salaam Remi through these record publishers.

Beese introduced Winehouse to his boss, Nick Gatfield; the Island head shared his enthusiasm in signing the young artist. Winehouse was signed to Island, as rival interest in her had started to build with representatives of EMI and Virgin starting to make moves. Beese told HitQuarters that he felt the excitement over an artist who was an atypical pop star for the time was due to a backlash against reality TV music shows, which included audiences starved for fresh, genuine young talent.

Winehouse's debut album, Frank, was released on 20 October 2003. Produced mainly by Salaam Remi, many songs were influenced by jazz and, apart from two covers, Winehouse co-wrote every song. The album received critical acclaim with compliments given to the "cool, critical gaze" in its lyrics. Winehouse's voice was compared with those of Sarah Vaughan and Macy Gray, among others.

The album entered the upper reaches of the UK Albums Chart in 2004 when it was nominated for the Brit Awards in the categories of British Female Solo Artist and British Urban Act. It went on to achieve platinum sales. Later in 2004, she and Remi won the Ivor Novello Award for Best Contemporary Song, for their first single together, "Stronger Than Me." The album was also shortlisted for the 2004 Mercury Music Prize. In the same year, she performed at the Glastonbury Festival – Jazzworld, the V Festival and the Montreal International Jazz Festival. After the release of the album, Winehouse commented that she was "only 80 percent behind [the] album" because Island Records had overruled her preferences for the songs and mixes to be included. The further singles from the album were "Take the Box," "In My Bed"/"You Sent Me Flying" and "Pumps"/"Help Yourself."

2006–2008: Back to Black and international success

After the release of her first jazz-influenced album, Winehouse's focus shifted to the girl groups of the 1950s and 1960s. Winehouse hired New York singer Sharon Jones's longtime band, the Dap-Kings, to back her up in the studio and on tour. Mitch Winehouse relates in Amy, My Daughter how fascinating watching her process was: her perfectionism in the studio and how she would put what she had sung on a CD and play it in his taxi outside to know how most people would hear her music. In May 2006, Winehouse's demo tracks such as "You Know I'm No Good" and "Rehab" appeared on Mark Ronson's New York radio show on East Village Radio. These were some of the first new songs played on the radio after the release of "Pumps" and both were slated to appear on her second album. The 11-track album, completed in five months, was produced entirely by Salaam Remi and Ronson, with the production credits being split between them. Ronson said in a 2010 interview that he liked working with Winehouse because she was blunt when she did not like his work. She in turn thought that when they first met, he was a sound engineer and that she was expecting an older man with a beard.

Promotion of Back to Black soon began and, in early October 2006 Winehouse's official website was relaunched with a new layout and clips of previously unreleased songs. Back to Black was released in the UK on 30 October 2006. It went to number one on the UK Albums Chart for two weeks in January 2007, dropping then climbing back for several weeks in February. In the US, it entered at number seven on the Billboard 200. It was the best-selling album in the UK of 2007, selling 1.85million copies over the course of the year. The first single released from the album was the Ronson-produced "Rehab". The song reached the top ten in the UK and the US. Time magazine named "Rehab" the Best Song of 2007. Writer Josh Tyrangiel praised Winehouse for her confidence, saying, "What she is is mouthy, funny, sultry, and quite possibly crazy" and "It's impossible not to be seduced by her originality. Combine it with production by Mark Ronson that references four decades worth of soul music without once ripping it off, and you've got the best song of 2007." The album's second single and lead single in the US, "You Know I'm No Good," was released in January 2007 with a remix featuring rap vocals by Ghostface Killah. It ultimately reached number 18 on the UK singles chart. The title track, "Back to Black," was released in the UK in April 2007 and peaked at number 25, but was more successful across mainland Europe. "Tears Dry on Their Own," "Love Is a Losing Game" were also released as singles, but failed to achieve the same level of success.

A deluxe edition of Back to Black was also released on 5 November 2007 in the UK. The bonus disc features B-sides, rare, and live tracks, as well as "Valerie". Winehouse's debut DVD I Told You I Was Trouble: Live in London was released the same day in the UK and 13 November in the US. It includes a live set recorded at London's Shepherd's Bush Empire and a 50-minute documentary charting the singer's career over the previous four years. Frank was released in the United States on 20 November 2007 to positive reviews. The album debuted at number 61 on the Billboard 200 chart. In addition to her own album, she collaborated with other artists on singles. Winehouse was a vocalist on the song "Valerie" on Ronson's solo album Version. The song peaked at number two in the UK, upon its October single release. "Valerie" was nominated for a 2008 Brit Award for British Single of the Year. Her work with ex-Sugababe Mutya Buena, "B Boy Baby," was released on 17 December 2007. It served as the fourth single from Buena's debut album, Real Girl. Winehouse was also in talks of working with Missy Elliott for her album Block Party.

Winehouse promoted the release of Back to Black with headline performances in late 2006, including a Little Noise Sessions charity concert at the Union Chapel in Islington, London. On 31 December 2006, Winehouse appeared on Jools Holland's Annual Hootenanny and performed a cover of Marvin Gaye's "I Heard It Through the Grapevine" along with Paul Weller and Holland's Rhythm and Blues Orchestra. She also performed Toots and the Maytals' "Monkey Man". At his request, actor Bruce Willis introduced Winehouse before her performance of "Rehab" at the 2007 MTV Movie Awards in Universal City, California, on 3 June 2007. During the summer of 2007, she performed at various festivals, including Glastonbury Festival and Lollapalooza in Chicago.

The rest of her tour, however, did not go as well. In November 2007, the opening night of a 17-date tour was marred by booing and walkouts at the National Indoor Arena in Birmingham. A critic for the Birmingham Mail said it was "one of the saddest nights of my life...I saw a supremely talented artist reduced to tears, stumbling around the stage and, unforgivably, swearing at the audience." Other concerts ended similarly, with, for example, fans at her Hammersmith Apollo performance in London saying that she "looked highly intoxicated throughout," until she announced on 27 November 2007, that her performances and public appearances were cancelled for the remainder of the year, citing her doctor's advice to take a complete rest. A statement issued by concert promoter Live Nation blamed "the rigours involved in touring and the intense emotional strain that Amy has been under in recent weeks" for the decision. Mitch Winehouse wrote about her nervousness before public performances in his 2012 book, Amy, My Daughter. On 13 January 2008, Back to Black held the number-one position on the Billboard Pan European charts for the third consecutive week.

On 10 February 2008, Winehouse received five Grammy Awards, winning in the following categories: Record of the Year, Song of the Year, Best Female Pop Vocal Performance for the single "Rehab", and Best Pop Vocal Album. The singer also earned a Grammy as Best New Artist, earning her an entry in the 2009 edition of the Guinness Book of Records for Most Grammy Awards won by a British Female Act. Additionally, Back to Black was nominated for Album of the Year. Ronson's work with her won the Grammy Award for Producer of the Year, in the non-classical category. She ended her acceptance speech for Record of the Year with, "This is for London because Camden Town ain't burning down," in reference to the 2008 Camden Market fire. Performing "You Know I'm No Good" and "Rehab" via satellite from London's Riverside Studios at 3 a.m. UK time, she couldn't be at the ceremony in Los Angeles as her visa approval had not been processed in time.

After the Grammys, the album's sales increased, catapulting Back to Black to number two on the US Billboard 200, after it initially peaked in the seventh position. On 20 February 2008, Winehouse performed at the 2008 Brit Awards at Earls Court in London, performing "Valerie" with Mark Ronson, followed by "Love Is a Losing Game". She urged the crowd to "make some noise for my Blake." A special deluxe edition of Back to Black topped the UK album charts on 2 March 2008. Meanwhile, the original edition of the album was ranked at number 30 in its 68th week on the charts, while Frank charted at number 35.

In Paris, she performed what was described as a "well-executed 40-minute" set at the opening of a Fendi boutique in early March. By 12 March, the album had sold a total of 2,467,575 copies—318,350 copies had been sold in the previous 10 weeks—putting the album on the UK's top-10 best-selling albums of the 21st century for the first time. On 7 April, Back to Black was in the top position of the pan-European charts for the sixth consecutive and thirteenth aggregate week. Amy Winehouse – The Girl Done Good: A Documentary Review, a 78-minute DVD, was released on 14 April 2008. The documentary features interviews with those who knew her at a young age, people who helped her achieve success, jazz music experts, and music and pop culture specialists.

At the 2008 Ivor Novello Awards in May, Winehouse became the first-ever artist to receive two nominations for the top award: Best Song Musically & Lyrically. She won the award for "Love Is a Losing Game" and was nominated for "You Know I'm No Good". "Rehab", a Novello winner for best contemporary song in 2006, also received a 2008 nomination for best-selling British song. Winehouse was also nominated for a 2008 MTV Europe Music Award in the Act of the Year category.

Although her father, manager and various members of her touring team reportedly tried to dissuade her, Winehouse performed at the Rock in Rio Lisboa festival in Portugal in May 2008. Although the set was plagued by a late arrival and problems with her voice, the crowd warmed to her. In addition to her own material she performed two Specials covers. Winehouse performed at Nelson Mandela's 90th Birthday Party concert at London's Hyde Park on 27 June 2008, and the next day at the Glastonbury Festival. On 12 July, at the Oxegen Festival in Ireland she performed a well-received 50-minute set which was followed the next day by a 14-song set at T in the Park.

On 16 August she played at the Staffordshire leg of the V Festival, and the following day played the Chelmsford leg of the festival. Organisers said that Winehouse attracted the biggest crowds of the festival. Audience reaction was reported as mixed. On 6 September, she was Bestival's Saturday headliner, where her performance was described as polished—terminated by a curfew as the show running overdue, after Winehouse started an hour late—and her storming off stage.

A clip of Winehouse's music was included in the "Roots and Influences" area that looked at connections between different artists at the Rock and Roll Hall of Fame Annex NYC, which opened in December 2008. One thread started with Billie Holiday, continued with Aretha Franklin and Mary J. Blige, and then finished with Winehouse.

Back to Black was the world's seventh-biggest-selling album of 2008. The album's sales meant that the market performance of Universal Music's recorded music division did not drop to levels experienced by the overall music market.

2009–2011: Final projects before death
In a 2009 poll of U.S. residents conducted for VisitBritain by Harris Interactive, one-fifth of the participants indicated they had listened to Winehouse's music during the previous year. She performed with Rhythms del Mundo on their cover of the Sam Cooke song, "Cupid", for an Artists Project Earth benefit album released in July that year.

Winehouse and Ronson contributed a cover of Lesley Gore's "It's My Party" to the Quincy Jones tribute album Q Soul Bossa Nostra, released in November 2010. She had agreed to form a group with Questlove of the Roots but her problems obtaining a visa delayed their working together. Salaam Remi had already created some material with Winehouse as part of the project. According to The Times, Universal Music pressed her for new material in 2008, but as of 2 September that year she had not been near a recording studio. In late October, Winehouse's spokesman was quoted as saying that Winehouse had not been given a deadline to complete her third album, for which she was learning to play drums.

In May 2009, Winehouse returned to performing at a jazz festival in Saint Lucia amid torrential downpours and technical difficulties. During her set, it was reported she was unsteady on her feet and had trouble remembering lyrics. She apologised to the crowd for being "bored" and ended the set in the middle of a song. During her stay in Saint Lucia, however, she worked on new music with Remi. On 23 August that year Winehouse sang with the Specials at the V Festival, on their songs "You're Wondering Now" and "Ghost Town".

Island claimed that a new album would be due for release in 2010. Island co-president Darcus Beese said, "I've heard a couple of song demos that have absolutely floored me." In July 2010, Winehouse was quoted as saying her next album would be released no later than January 2011, saying "It's going to be very much the same as my second album, where there's a lot of jukebox stuff and songs that are... just jukebox, really." Ronson, however, said at that time that he had not started to record the album. She performed "Valerie" with Ronson at a movie premiere but forgot some of the song's lyrics. In October, Winehouse performed a four-song set to promote her fashion line. In December 2010, she played a 40-minute concert at a Russian oligarch's party in Moscow, with the tycoon hand-selecting the songs.

In January 2011, Winehouse played five dates in Brazil, with opening acts of Janelle Monáe and Mayer Hawthorne. The following month she cut a performance in Dubai short following booing from the audience. Winehouse was reported to be tired, distracted and "tipsy" during the performance.

On 18 June 2011, Winehouse started her twelve-leg European tour in Belgrade. Local media described her performance as a scandal and disaster; she was booed off the stage due to her apparently being too drunk to perform. Serbian defence minister Dragan Šutanovac called Winehouse's performances "a huge shame and a disappointment". It was reported that she was unable to remember the city she was in, the lyrics of her songs or the names of the members of her band. The local press also claimed that Winehouse was forced to perform by her bodyguards, who did not allow her to leave the stage when she tried to do so. She then pulled out of performances in Istanbul and Athens, which had been scheduled for the following week. On 21 June, it was announced that she had cancelled all shows of her tour and would be given "as long as it takes" to sort herself out.

Winehouse's last public appearance took place at Camden's Roundhouse on 20 July 2011, when she made a surprise appearance on stage to support her goddaughter, Dionne Bromfield, who was singing "Mama Said" with the Wanted. Winehouse died three days later. Her last recording was a duet with American singer Tony Bennett for his album, Duets II, released on 20 September 2011. Their single from the album, "Body and Soul", was released on 14 September 2011 on MTV and VH1 to commemorate what would have been her 28th birthday.

Other ventures

Winehouse joined a campaign to stop a block of flats being built beside the George Tavern, a famous London East End music venue. Campaign supporters feared the residential development would end the spot's lucrative sideline as a film and photo location, on which it relies to survive. As part of a breast cancer awareness campaign, Winehouse appeared in a revealing photograph for the April 2008 issue of Easy Living magazine. Winehouse had an estimated £10m fortune, tying her for tenth place in the 2008 The Sunday Times listing of the wealth of musicians under age 30. The following year her fortune had dropped to an estimated £5m. Her finances are run by Mitch and Janis Winehouse. It was reported she earned about £1m singing at two private parties during Paris Fashion Week. as well as another £1m to perform at a Moscow Art Gallery for Russian oligarch Roman Abramovich. Winehouse loaned a vintage dress used in her video for "Tears Dry on Their Own" as well as a DVD to the British Music Experience, a new museum dedicated to the history of British pop music. The museum, located at the O2 Arena in London, opened on 9 March 2009.

In January 2009, Winehouse announced that she was launching her own record label. The first act on her Lioness Records is Winehouse's 13-year-old goddaughter, Dionne Bromfield. Her first album, featuring covers of classic soul records, was released on 12 October 2009. Winehouse is the backing singer on several tracks on the album and she performed backing vocals for Bromfield on the BBC's television programme Strictly Come Dancing on 10 October.

Winehouse and her family are the subject of a 2009 documentary shot by Daphne Barak titled Saving Amy. Winehouse entered into a joint venture in 2009 with EMI to launch a range of wrapping paper and gift cards containing song lyrics from her album Back to Black. On 8 January 2010, a television documentary, My Daughter Amy, aired on Channel 4. Saving Amy was released as a paperback book in January 2010.

Winehouse collaborated on a 17 piece fashion collection with the Fred Perry label. It was released for sale in October 2010. According to Fred Perry's marketing director "We had three major design meetings where she was closely involved in product style selection and the application of fabric, colour and styling details," and gave "crucial input on proportion, colour and fit." The collection consists of "vintage-inspired looks including Capri pants, a bowling dress, a trench coat, pencil skirts, a longline argyle sweater and a pink-and-black checkerboard-printed collared shirt." At the behest of her family, three forthcoming collections up to and including autumn/winter 2012 that she had designed prior to her death were released.

Awards and nominations

Among the awards and recognition for her debut album Frank, Winehouse earned an Ivor Novello Award from the British Academy of Songwriters for Best Contemporary Song ("Stronger Than Me"), a Brit Award nomination for Best British Female Solo Artist, and an inclusion in Robert Dimery's 2006 book, 1001 Albums You Must Hear Before You Die.

Her second studio album, Back to Black, produced numerous nominations, including two Brit Awards (Best British Album, and won her Best British Female Solo Artist), six Grammy Awards (including five wins), four Ivor Novello Awards, four MTV Europe Music Awards, three MTV Video Music Awards, three World Music Awards, and it was nominated for the Mercury Prize (Album of the Year) and a MOBO Awards (Best UK Female). During her career, Winehouse received 23 awards from 60 nominations.

Critical appraisal
Winehouse was known for her deep, expressive contralto vocals and her eclectic mix of musical genres, including soul, (sometimes labelled as blue-eyed soul and neo soul), rhythm and blues, and jazz. The BBC's Garry Mulholland called Winehouse "the pre-eminent vocal talent of her generation". According to AllMusic's Cyril Cordor, she was one of the UK's premier singers during the 2000s; "fans and critics alike embraced her rugged charm, brash sense of humor, and distinctively soulful and jazzy vocals". In The Guardian, Caroline Sullivan later wrote that "her idolisation of Dinah Washington and the Ronettes distinguished her from almost all newly minted pop singers of the early 2000s; her exceptionally-susceptible-to-heartbreak voice did the rest". Soon after Winehouse's death, a number of prominent critics assessed the singer's legacy: Maura Johnston from The Village Voice said, "When she was on, Winehouse had few peers—she wasn't an octave-jumper like other big divas of the moment, but her contralto had a snap to it that enriched even the simplest syllables with a full spectrum of emotion"; Sasha Frere-Jones of The New Yorker proclaimed, "Nobody can match Winehouse's unique transitions or her utterly weird phrasings. She sounded like an original sixties soul star, developed when the landscape had no rules. But now untrammeled traditionalism is in the lead and her beautiful footnote has been cut short. American soul—through visionaries like Erykah Badu and Janelle Monáe and Jill Scott—had moved on. But Winehouse was a fine shepherd of the past."

By contrast, Robert Christgau dismissed Winehouse as "a self-aggrandizing self-abuser who's taken seriously because she makes a show of soul". In his opinion, the singer "simulated gravitas by running her suicidal tendencies through an amalgam of 20th-century African-American vocal stylings—the slides, growls, and melismatic outcries that for many matures are now the only reliable signifiers of pop substance".

On 13 February 2012, Winehouse was ranked 26th on VH1's 100 Greatest Women in Music list. In March 2017, singer-songwriter Bob Dylan said he was enjoying listening to Winehouse's last record (Back to Black), and called her "the last real individualist around".

Image

Winehouse's greatest love was 1960s girl groups. Her hairdresser, Alex Foden, borrowed her "instantly recognisable" beehive hairdo (a weave) and she borrowed her Cleopatra makeup from the Ronettes. Her imitation was so successful, as The Village Voice reports: "Ronnie Spector—who, it could be argued, all but invented Winehouse's style in the first place when she took the stage at the Brooklyn Fox Theater with her fellow Ronettes more than 40 years ago—was so taken aback at a picture of Winehouse in the New York Post that she exclaimed, "I don't know her, I never met her, and when I saw that pic, I thought, 'That's me!' But then I found out, no, it's Amy! I didn't have on my glasses."

The New York Times style reporter, Guy Trebay, discussed the multiplicity of influences on Winehouse's style after her death. Trebay noted, "her stylish husband, Blake Fielder-Civil, may have influenced her look." Additionally, Trebay observed:

Former Rolling Stone editor Joe Levy, who had put her on the magazine's cover, broke her look down this way:

Winehouse's use of bold red lipstick, thick eyebrows and heavy eyeliner came from Latinas she saw in Miami, on her trip there to work with Salaam Remi on Back to Black. Her look was repeatedly denigrated by the British press. At the same time that the NME Awards nominated Winehouse in the categories of "Best Solo Artist" and "Best Music DVD" in 2008, they awarded her "Worst Dressed Performer". Winehouse was also ranked number two on Richard Blackwell's 48th annual "Ten Worst Dressed Women" list, behind Victoria Beckham.

Controversies
Winehouse's dichotomous public image of critical and commercial success versus personal turmoil prompted significant media comment. The New Statesman called Winehouse "a filthy-mouthed, down-to-earth diva", while Newsweek called her "a perfect storm of sex kitten, raw talent and poor impulse control". Karen Heller with The Philadelphia Inquirer summarised the maelstrom this way:

By 2008, her drug problems threatened her career. As Nick Gatfield, the president of Island Records, toyed with the idea of releasing Winehouse "to deal with her problems", he said, "It's a reflection of her status [in the US] that when you flick through the TV coverage [of the Grammys] it's her image they use." Post-Grammys, some questioned whether Winehouse should have been honoured with the awards given her recent personal and drug problems, including Natalie Cole, who introduced Winehouse at the ceremony and who herself battled substance-abuse problems while winning a Grammy for Best New Artist in 1975. (Winehouse was prevented from travelling to and performing at the Grammy Awards ceremony in the US due to failing a drug test.) In a newspaper commentary, the executive director of the UN Office on Drugs and Crime, Antonio Maria Costa, said that the alleged drug habits of Winehouse and other celebrities sent a bad message "to others who are vulnerable to addiction" and undermine the efforts of other celebrities trying to raise awareness of problems in Africa, now that more cocaine used in Europe passes through that continent. Winehouse's spokesperson noted that "Amy has never given a quote about drugs or flaunted it in any way. She's had some problems and is trying to get better. The U.N. should get its own house in order."

In January 2008, her record label stated it believed the extensive media coverage she had received increased record sales. In an April 2008 poll conducted by Sky News, Winehouse was named the second-greatest "ultimate heroine" by the UK population at large, topping the voting for that category of those polled under 25 years old. Psychologist Donna Dawson commented that the results demonstrated that women like Winehouse who had "a certain sense of vulnerability or have had to fight against some adversity in their lives" received recognition.

In July 2008, BBC Radio Scotland's head, Jeff Zycinski, stated that the BBC, and media in general, were complicit in undermining celebrities, including Winehouse. He said that public interest in the singer's lifestyle did not make her lifestyle newsworthy. Rod McKenzie, editor of the BBC Radio One programme Newsbeat, replied: "If you play [Amy Winehouse's] music to a certain demographic, those same people want to know what's happening in her private life. If you don't cover it, you're insulting young licence fee payers." In The Scotsman, British singer and songwriter Lily Allen was quoted to have said – "I know Amy Winehouse very well. And she is very different to what people portray her as being. Yes, she does get out of her mind on drugs sometimes, but she is also a very clever, intelligent, witty, funny person who can hold it together. You just don't see that side."

Charity work
Throughout her life Winehouse donated her money, music and time to many charities, particularly those concerned with children. She was once named "the most charitable act" by Pop World. While this side of her personality was never well known to the general public, throughout both the arts community and the charity community she was known for her generosity.

In 2008, Winehouse appeared naked in an issue of Easy Living Magazine to raise awareness of breast cancer. In 2009, she appeared on a CD called Classics alongside musicians such as the Rolling Stones, the Killers and many Cuban musicians to raise awareness of climate change. In March 2011, Winehouse donated over £20,000 worth of clothes to a local charity shop in London.

A Caribbean man Julian Jean DeBaptiste revealed that Winehouse had paid for his urgent surgery costing £4,000 during her stay in Saint Lucia in 2009. "I had surgery on 1 July 2009... it cost a fortune and Amy paid for the whole thing. I tried to thank her but she just hugged me and told me not to say anything. Her generosity gave me my life back."

Personal life

Winehouse was raised Jewish and expressed pride in being Jewish, although she was not religious. During one interview, Winehouse said "being Jewish to me is about being together as a real family. It's not about lighting candles and saying a bracha." Winehouse also frequently performed with a large Star of David medallion.

In 2013, in memory of Winehouse, the Jewish Museum London ran an exhibition titled "Amy Winehouse: A Family Portrait". The museum researched her paternal great-great-grandfather's arrival from Minsk in 1890, and how the family finally settled in London, starting out in working-class jobs before gradually moving to middle-class jobs.

Winehouse had 14 known tattoos, including "Daddy's Girl" on her left arm for her father and a pin-up girl with the name "Cynthia" on her right arm in memory of her Jewish grandmother.

Relationships
Winehouse dated chef-musician Alex Clare in 2006, while on a break from her on-off boyfriend and future husband, Blake Fielder-Civil. She and Clare lived together briefly, and in a pattern that Fielder-Civil would later repeat, Clare sold his story to the News of the World, which published it under the headline "Bondage Crazed Amy Just Can't Beehive in Bed."

Fielder-Civil, a former video production assistant, had dropped out of Bourne Grammar School and, aged 16, moved to London from his native Lincolnshire. He married Winehouse on 18 May 2007, in Miami Beach, Florida. In a June 2007 interview, Winehouse admitted she could sometimes be violent toward him after she had been drinking, saying: "If he says one thing I don't like, then I'll chin him." In August 2007, they were photographed, bloodied and bruised, in the streets of London after an alleged fight, although she contended her injuries were self-inflicted. Winehouse's parents and in-laws publicly reported their numerous concerns, the latter citing fears that the two might commit suicide. Fielder-Civil's father encouraged fans to boycott Winehouse's music, and Mitch Winehouse said this would not help. Fielder-Civil was quoted in a British tabloid as saying he introduced Winehouse to crack cocaine and heroin. During a visit with Mitch Winehouse at the prison in July 2008, Fielder-Civil reportedly said that he and Winehouse would cut themselves to ease the pain of withdrawal.

From 21 July 2008 to 25 February 2009, Fielder-Civil was imprisoned following his guilty plea on charges of trying to pervert the course of justice and of grievous bodily harm with intent. The incident, in July 2007, involved his assault of a pub landlord that broke the victim's cheek. According to the prosecution, the landlord accepted £200,000 as part of a deal to "effectively throw the [court] case and not turn up", and he testified that the money belonged to Winehouse, but she pulled out of a meeting with the men involved in the plot, to attend an awards ceremony. Mitch Winehouse, as manager of his daughter's money, has denied the payoff came from her.

When Winehouse was spotted with aspiring actor Josh Bowman on holiday in Saint Lucia, in early January 2009, she said she was "in love again, and I don't need drugs." She commented that her "whole marriage was based on doing drugs" and that "for the time being I've just forgotten I'm even married." On 12 January, Winehouse's spokesman confirmed that "papers have been received" for what Fielder-Civil's solicitor said were divorce proceedings based on a claim of adultery. In March, Winehouse was quoted in a magazine as saying, "I still love Blake and I want him to move into my new house with me—that was my plan all along ... I won't let him divorce me. He's the male version of me and we're perfect for each other." Nonetheless, an uncontested divorce was granted on 16 July 2009 and became final on 28 August 2009. Fielder-Civil received no money in the settlement.

She was in a relationship with a British writer and director of films, Reg Traviss, from early 2010 until she died. According to media reports and a biography written by Winehouse's father, Traviss and Winehouse had planned to marry and intended to have children.

After Winehouse's death, Pete Doherty said that he and Winehouse had been lovers at one point. However, in July 2008, when Rolling Stone reporter Claire Hoffman asked Winehouse about her relationship with Doherty, Winehouse replied: "We're just good friends", and added: "I asked Pete to do a concept EP, and he made this face, he looked at me like I'd pooed on the floor. He wouldn't do it. We're just really close".

Substance abuse and mental illness
Winehouse's battles with substance abuse were the subject of much media attention. In 2005, she went through a period of drinking, heavy drug use, and weight loss. People who saw her during the end of that year and early 2006 reported a rebound that coincided with the writing of Back to Black. Her family believes that the mid-2006 death of her grandmother, who was a stabilising influence, set her off into addiction. In August 2007, Winehouse cancelled a number of shows in the UK and Europe, citing exhaustion and ill health. She was hospitalised during this period for what was reported as an overdose of heroin, ecstasy, cocaine, ketamine and alcohol. In various interviews, she admitted to having problems with self-harm, depression, and eating disorders.

Winehouse told a magazine that the drugs were to blame for her hospitalisation and that "I really thought that it was over for me then." Soon afterwards, Winehouse's father commented that when he had made public statements regarding her problems he was using the media because it seemed the only way to get through to her. In an interview with The Album Chart Show on British television, Winehouse said she was manic depressive and not alcoholic, adding that that sounded like "an alcoholic in denial". A US reporter writes that Winehouse was a "victim of mental illness in a society that doesn't understand or respond to mental illness with great effectiveness."

In December 2007, Winehouse's spokesman reported that the singer was in a physician-supervised programme and was channelling her difficulties by writing a lot of music. The British tabloid The Sun posted a video of a woman, alleged to be Winehouse, apparently smoking crack cocaine and speaking of having taken ecstasy and valium. Winehouse's father moved in with her, and Island Records, her record label, announced the abandonment of plans for an American promotion campaign on her behalf. In late January 2008, Winehouse reportedly entered a rehabilitation facility for a two-week treatment program.

On 23 January 2008, the video was passed on to the Metropolitan Police, who questioned her on 5 February. No charges were brought. On 26 March 2008, Winehouse's spokesman said she was "doing well". Her record company reportedly believed that her recovery remained fragile. By late April 2008, her erratic behaviourincluding an allegation of assaultcaused fear that her drug rehabilitation efforts had been unsuccessful. Winehouse's father and manager then sought to have her detained under the Mental Health Act of 1983. Her dishevelled appearance during and after a scheduled club night in September 2008 prompted new rumours of a relapse. Photographers were quoted as saying she appeared to have cuts on her arms and legs.

According to her physician, Winehouse quit using illegal substances in 2008. In an October 2010 interview, speaking of her decision to quit drugs, Winehouse said, "I literally woke up one day and was like, 'I don't want to do this any more. However, alcohol emerged as a problem, with Winehouse abstaining for a few weeks and then lapsing into alcohol abuse. Her physician said that Winehouse was treated with Librium for alcohol withdrawal and anxiety and underwent psychological and psychiatric evaluations in 2010, but refused psychological therapy.

Violence and legal difficulties
In 2006, Winehouse admitted to punching a female fan in the face for criticising her having taken Blake Fielder-Civil as a husband. She then attacked her own spouse as he attempted to calm her down, kneeing him in the crotch. In October 2007, Winehouse and Fielder-Civil were arrested in Bergen, Norway, for possession of seven grams of cannabis. The couple were later released and fined 3850 kroner (around £350). Winehouse first appealed the fines, but later dropped the appeal.

On 26 April 2008, Winehouse was cautioned after she admitted to police she slapped a 38-year-old man in the face, a "common assault" offence, her first of two. She voluntarily turned herself in and was held overnight. Police said, at her arrival she was "in no fit state" to be interviewed. Ten days later, Winehouse was arrested on suspicion of possessing drugs after a video of her apparently smoking crack cocaine was passed to the police in January, but was released on bail a few hours later because they could not confirm, from the video, what she was smoking. The Crown Prosecution Service considered charging her, but cleared her when it could not establish that the substance in the video was a controlled drug. Some members of Parliament reacted negatively. Two London residents were subsequently charged with conspiracy to supply cocaine and ecstasy to Winehouse. One of the pair was sentenced to two years in prison on 13 December 2008, while the other received a two-year community order.

On 5 March 2009, Winehouse was arrested and charged with common assault following a claim by dancer Sherene Flash that Winehouse hit her in the eye at the September 2008 Prince's Trust charity ball. Winehouse's spokesperson announced the cancellation of the singer's US Coachella Festival appearance in light of the new legal issue, and Winehouse appeared in court on 17 March to enter her plea of not guilty. On 23 July, her trial began with prosecutor Lyall Thompson charging that Winehouse acted with "deliberate and unjustifiable violence" while appearing to be under the influence of alcohol or another substance. She testified that she did not punch Flash, but tried to push her away because she was scared of her; she cited her worry that Flash would sell her story to a tabloid, Flash's height advantage, and Flash's "rude" behaviour. On 24 July, District Judge Timothy Workman ruled that Winehouse was not guilty, citing the facts that all but two of the witnesses were intoxicated at the time of the incident and that medical evidence did not show "the sort of injury that often occurs when there is a forceful punch to the eye."

On 19 December 2009, Winehouse was arrested for a third time on charges of common assault, plus another charge of public order offence after assaulting the front-of-house manager of the Milton Keynes Theatre after he asked her to move from her seat. Winehouse pled guilty to the charges and was given a conditional discharge.

Paparazzi
With the paparazzi taking photographs of her wherever they could, Winehouse obtained an injunction against a leading paparazzi agency, Big Pictures, under the Protection from Harassment Act 1997; the resultant court order issued by the High Court in 2009 banned them from following her. Photographers were also banned from following her within 100 metres of her London home and photographing Winehouse in her home or the homes of her friends and relatives. According to a newspaper report, sources close to the singer said legal action was taken out of concern for the safety of Winehouse and those close to her.

Respiratory and other health problems
On 23 June 2008, Winehouse's publicist corrected earlier misstatements by Mitch Winehouse that his daughter had early stage emphysema, instead claiming she had signs of what could lead to early-stage emphysema. Mitch Winehouse had also stated that his daughter's lungs were operating at 70 percent capacity and that she had an irregular heartbeat. He said that these problems had been caused by her chain smoking crack cocaine. The singer's father also reported that doctors had warned Winehouse that, if she continued smoking crack cocaine, she would have to wear an oxygen mask and would eventually die. In a radio interview, Mitch Winehouse said the singer was responding "fabulously" to treatment, which included being covered with nicotine patches. British Lung Foundation spokesman Keith Prowse noted this type of condition could be managed with treatment. Prowse also said the condition was not normal for a person her age but "heavy smoking and inhaling other substances like drugs can age the lungs prematurely." Norman H. Edelman of the American Lung Association explained that if she stopped smoking, her lung functions would decline at the rate of a normal person, but continued smoking would lead to a more rapid decline in lung function.

Winehouse was released from the London Clinic 24 hours after returning from a temporary leave to perform at Nelson Mandela's 90th birthday and at a concert in Glastonbury, and continued receiving treatment as an outpatient. In July 2008, Winehouse stated that she had been diagnosed with "some areas of emphysema" and said she was getting herself together by "eating loads of healthy food, sleeping loads, playing my guitar, making music and writing letters to my husband every day." She also kept a vertical tanning bed in her flat. Winehouse began precautionary testing on her lungs and chest on 25 October 2008 at the London Clinic for what was reported as a chest infection. Winehouse was in and out of the facility and was granted permission to set her own schedule regarding home leave. She returned to the hospital on 23 November 2008 for a reported reaction to her medication.

Death

Winehouse's bodyguard said that he had arrived at her residence three days before her death and felt she had been somewhat intoxicated. He observed moderate drinking over the next few days, and said she had been "laughing, listening to music and watching TV at 2 a.m. the day of her death". At 10 a.m. BST on 23 July 2011, he observed her lying on her bed and tried (unsuccessfully) to rouse her. This did not raise much suspicion because she usually slept late after a night out. According to the bodyguard, shortly after 3p.m., he checked on her again and observed her lying in the same position as before, leading to a further check, in which he concluded that she was not breathing and had no pulse; he said he called emergency services. At 3:54p.m., two ambulances reached Winehouse's home in Camden, London. Winehouse was pronounced dead at the scene. Shortly afterwards, the Metropolitan Police confirmed that she had died. Her death at age 27 prompted media comparisons to other musician deaths at the same age, collectively named the 27 Club.

After her death was announced, media and camera crews appeared, as crowds gathered near Winehouse's residence to pay their respects. Forensic investigators entered the flat as police cordoned off the street outside; they recovered one small and two large bottles of vodka from her room. After her death, the singer broke her second Guinness World Record: for the most songs by a woman to simultaneously appear on the UK singles chart, with eight.

A coroner's inquest reached a verdict of misadventure. The report released on 26 October 2011 explained that Winehouse's blood alcohol content was 416 per 100 (0.416%) at the time of her death, more than five times the legal drink-drive limit. According to the coroner, "The unintended consequences of such potentially fatal levels was her sudden death."

Winehouse's record label, Universal Republic, released a statement that read in part: "We are deeply saddened at the sudden loss of such a gifted musician, artist and performer." Many musical artists have since paid tribute to Winehouse including U2, M.I.A., Lady Gaga, Marianne Faithfull, Ronnie Spector, Bruno Mars, Nicki Minaj, Keisha Buchanan, Rihanna, George Michael, Adele, Kelly Clarkson, Courtney Love, and the punk rock band Green Day, who wrote a song in her tribute titled "Amy". In her 2012 album Banga, singer Patti Smith released "This Is the Girl", written as an homage to Winehouse. Mark Ronson dedicated his UK number-one album Uptown Special to Winehouse, stating: "I'm always thinking of you and inspired by you." Winehouse did not leave a will; her estate was inherited by her parents. Winehouse's parents set up the Amy Winehouse Foundation to prevent harm from drug misuse among young people; her brother Alex is an employee.

On 17 December 2012, British authorities reopened the probe into Winehouse's death. On 8 January 2013, a second inquest confirmed that Winehouse died of an accidental alcohol overdose. In a June 2013 interview, Alex Winehouse revealed his belief that his sister's eating disorder, and the consequent physical weakness, was the primary cause of her death:

Funeral
Family and friends attended Winehouse's private funeral on 26 July 2011 at Edgwarebury Lane Cemetery in north London. Her mother and father, Janis and Mitch Winehouse, close friends Nick Grimshaw and Kelly Osbourne, producer Mark Ronson, goddaughter Dionne Bromfield and her boyfriend Reg Traviss were among those in attendance at the private service led by Rabbi Frank Hellner. Her father delivered the eulogy, saying "Goodnight, my angel, sleep tight. Mummy and Daddy love you ever so much." Carole King's "So Far Away" closed the service with mourners singing along. She was later cremated at Golders Green Crematorium. The family planned to sit a two-day shiva. On 16 September 2012, Winehouse's ashes were buried alongside her grandmother's, Cynthia Levy at Edgwarebury Lane Cemetery.

Legacy and honours

Artwork and tributes

London's Mall Galleries opened an exhibition in May 2008 that included a sculpture of Winehouse, titled Excess. The piece, created by Guy Portelli, had a miniature of the singer lying on top of a cracked champagne bottle, with a pool of spilled liquid underneath. The body was covered with what appeared to be tiny pills, while one outstretched hand held a glass. Another piece, a print titled Celebrity 1 by artist Charlotte Suckling, was shown in the same exhibition.

A wax sculpture of Winehouse went on display at the London Madame Tussauds on 23 July 2008. The singer did not attend the unveiling, although her parents did. A sculpture by Marco Perego, titled The Only Good Rock Star Is a Dead Rock Star, that depicts Winehouse lying in a pool of blood with an apple and a bullet hole in her head after being shot by American novelist and Beat poet William S. Burroughs (in a recreation of the accidental killing of his wife Joan Vollmer), was scheduled to go on display in New York's Half Gallery on 14 November 2008 with a sale price of US$100,000. Perego said of the sculpture: "Rock stars are the sacrificial animals of society." Winehouse's spokesperson stated: "It's a funny kind of tribute. The artist seems in thrall to a tabloid persona that is not the real Amy. People often use her image to sell their work."

In 2012, Winehouse was among the British cultural icons selected by artist Sir Peter Blake to appear in a new version of his most famous artwork – the Beatles' Sgt. Pepper's Lonely Hearts Club Band album cover – to celebrate the British cultural figures of his life that he most admires.

On 14 September 2014 (which would have been Winehouse's 31st birthday), a statue was unveiled of her, which was created by sculptor Scott Eaton, at Stables Market in Camden Town, north London. Fans and relatives gathered for the unveiling in Camden's Stable Market, where it will be a permanent memorial to her. London-based Eaton, who sculpted the piece after being introduced to Winehouse's father Mitch, said the statue was meant to capture her "attitude and strength, but also give subtle hints of insecurity." Her father Mitch said of the statue: "Now Amy will oversee the comings and goings of her home town forever... Amy was in love with Camden and it is the place her fans from all over the world associate her with."

In 2018 the artist Dan Llywelyn Hall’s portrait of the singer ‘Amy’s Glance’ was exhibited at The London Art Fair

In March 2020, Winehouse's name on a stone was unveiled on the new Music Walk of Fame in Camden, with her parents Mitch and Janis in attendance at the ceremony.

Influence
Adele has credited Winehouse's success in making her and fellow British singer Duffy's journey to the United States "a bit smoother." Lady Gaga credited Winehouse with paving the way for her rise to the top of the charts, explaining that Winehouse made it easier for unconventional women to have mainstream pop success. Raphael Saadiq, Anthony Hamilton and John Legend said "Amy Winehouse was produced by people who wanted to create a marketing coup. The positive side is that it reacquainted an audience with this music and played an introductory role for others. This reinvigorated the genre by overcoming the vintage aspect."

Other artists that have credited Winehouse as an influence and/or for paving the way for them include Bruno Mars, Tove Lo, Jessie J, Emeli Sandé, Victoria Justice, Paloma Faith, Lana Del Rey, Sam Smith, Florence Welch, Halsey, Alessia Cara, Estelle, Daya, Jorja Smith, Lauren Jauregui and Billie Eilish.

After the release of Back to Black, record companies sought out female artists with a similar sound and fearless and experimental female musicians in general. Adele and Duffy were the second wave of artists with a sound similar to Winehouse's. A third wave of female musicians that has emerged since the album was released are led by V V Brown, Florence and the Machine, La Roux and Little Boots. In March 2011, the New York Daily News ran an article attributing the continuing wave of British female artists that have been successful in the United States to Winehouse and her absence. Spin magazine music editor Charles Aaron was quoted as saying "Amy Winehouse was the Nirvana moment for all these women," "They can all be traced back to her in terms of attitude, musical styles or fashion." According to Keith Caulfield, chart manager for Billboard, "Because of Amy, or the lack thereof, the marketplace was able to get singers like Adele, Estelle and Duffy," "Now those ladies have brought on the new ones, like Eliza Doolittle, Rumer and Ellie."

Amy Winehouse Foundation

After the singer's death by alcohol intoxication in July 2011, the Amy Winehouse Foundation was set up by Winehouse's family and launched on 14 September 2011 (which would have been Winehouse's 28th birthday). Its aim is to help vulnerable or disadvantaged young people, and it works with other charitable organisations to provide frontline support. Its central office is in North London, but it also has an office in New York (operating under the name 'The Amy Winehouse Foundation US'). Jon Snow is a patron for the charity, with Barbara Windsor also before she died in 2020, and ambassadors include Jess Glynne, Patsy Palmer, Jessie Wallace, Keira Chaplin and Mica Paris. In October 2015 Mark Ronson became a patron. Amy's brother Alex works full-time for the foundation, having given up his career as an online music journalist.

The charity itself works to prevent the effects of drug and alcohol misuse on young people and it also aims to support, inform and inspire vulnerable and disadvantaged young people to help them reach their full potential. On 12 March 2013, with the help of ex-addict Russell Brand, the Foundation launched the Amy Winehouse Foundation Resilience Programme For Schools across the UK which aims to provide effective education around drugs, alcohol and dealing with emotional issues.

Films

Documentary film

A documentary film, Amy (2015), directed by Asif Kapadia and produced by James Gay-Rees was released on 3 July 2015. The film covers Winehouse's life, her relationships, her struggles with substance abuse both before and after her career blossomed, and which eventually caused her death. The film received its première at the 2015 Cannes Film Festival on 16 May and has been reviewed as "a tragic masterpiece", "brilliant", "heartbreaking" and "unmissable". The soundtrack of the same name was released on 30 October 2015, along with the DVD that includes music featured in the documentary by film composer Antônio Pinto and classic and some unreleased tracks by Winehouse. The film was highly acclaimed and received various accolades, including the Academy Award for Best Documentary Feature at the 2016 Oscars, Best Music Film at the 2016 Grammy Awards, the BAFTA for Best Documentary, the MTV Movie Award for Best Documentary, in addition to a nomination for the BAFTA Award for Best British Film.

Biopic film

In October 2018, it was announced that Winehouse's estate had signed a deal to make a biopic about her life and career.

In July 2022, it was reported that the feature film entitled Back To Black will be produced by StudioCanal UK, distributed by Focus Features and directed by Sam Taylor-Johnson who previously created a biopic based on The Beatles star John Lennon, Nowhere Boy (2009) and Fifty Shades of Grey (2015). The script was written by Matt Greenhalgh and the release date is yet to be announced. In January 2023, it was revealed that British actress Marisa Abela would play the leading role of Winehouse and filming commenced later that month in London.

Musical
On 9 October 2017, it was announced by Winehouse's father Mitch that a West End/Broadway musical on Amy is in the works. Mitch Winehouse revealed the news at the Amy Winehouse Foundation Gala event in London.

Posthumous retrospectives 
Winehouse's parents have each written memoirs about their daughter and donated the proceeds from both books to the Amy Winehouse Foundation. In the introduction to Mitch Winehouse's biography, entitled Amy: My Daughter (2012), he explained: "Apart from being her father, I was also her friend, confidant and adviser—not that she always took my advice, but she always heard me out." Her mother Janis published Loving Amy: A Mother's Story, in 2014.

An exhibit of Winehouse's personal items, co-curated by her brother and sister-in-law, entitled Amy Winehouse: A Family Portrait, was on display at the Jewish Museum London from 3 July 2013 until 15 September 2013, and later exhibited in San Francisco, 23 July 2015 to 1 November 2015. Display items, such as books and music, were featured together with captions written by Winehouse's brother.

In late 2011, there were reports that Winehouse's former boyfriend, Reg Traviss, was developing a film about her. Winehouse's father Mitch Winehouse, who owns the copyright to his daughter's music, said he would not authorise the use of her music for the film.

Winehouse is the subject of Amy (2015), a documentary directed by Asif Kapadia and produced by James Gay-Rees, Kapadia, and Universal Music. Kapadia and Gay-Rees introduced the project at the 2013 Cannes Film Festival. The film debuted at the 2015 Cannes Film Festival and won the 2016 Academy Award for Best Documentary Feature.
In 2018, a documentary film based on Winehouse's album Back to Black, Amy Winehouse – Back to Black was released. It contains new interviews as well as archival footage. It was made by Eagle Vision and produced by Gil Cang. Released on DVD on 2 November 2018, the film features interviews by producers Ronson & Remi, who worked half and half on the album, along with the Dap Kings, Remi's music team, Ronnie Spector from the Ronettes and close ones to Winehouse, including Nick Shymansky, Juliette Ashby and Dionne Bromfield. The film is accompanied by An Intimate Evening in London, footage of a show Winehouse gave at Riverside Studios, London in 2008. In February 2019, Salaam Remi released a compilation album including the song "Find My Love" which is a posthumous collaboration between Winehouse and rapper Nas.

In 2020, an exhibition entitled Beyond Black – The Style of Amy Winehouse opened at the Grammy Museum in Los Angeles. The exhibit mainly explores Winehouse's style and fashion, displaying her outfits such as her iconic dresses, shoes, hair accessories, her makeup bag as well as Winehouse's personal belongings including her Grammy awards from 2008, handwritten lyrics, records and unseen home videos. The exhibition went on display in the U.S. from 17 January 2020 until 13 April 2020. In November 2021, various of Winehouse's personal items and famous dresses would later be auctioned at Julien's Auctions in Los Angeles and made more than £3m, 30% going to the Amy Winehouse Foundation. A follow-up exhibition Amy: Beyond the Stage opened on 26 November 2021 until 10 April 2022 at the Design Museum in Kensington, London which also presented some of Winehouse's personal belongings and focus on her fashion sense, as well as paying homage to her musical career.

In July 2021, a new documentary entitled Reclaiming Amy aired on BBC Two to mark the 10th anniversary of Winehouse's death. The film was primarily based on the perspective and narrated by her mother Janis Winehouse-Collins and included intimate stories of those who were close to Winehouse until the end of her life, including close friends Naomi Parry (Winehouse's stylist), Catriona Gourlay and Chantelle Dusette.

Discography

Frank (2003)
Back to Black (2006)
Lioness: Hidden Treasures (2011)

Filmography
Amy (2015)
Amy Winehouse: Back to Black (2018)
Reclaiming Amy (2021)

See also
List of deaths through alcohol

References

Sources

Further reading

External links

 
 
 
 
 
Amy Winehouse Foundation - Charity Commission for England and Wales

 
1983 births
2011 deaths
20th-century English singers
20th-century English women singers
21st-century English singers
21st-century English women singers
Alcohol-related deaths in England
Alumni of the Sylvia Young Theatre School
Belarusian Jews
Brit Award winners
British women jazz singers
English contraltos
English jazz singers
English Jews
English people convicted of assault
English people of Polish-Jewish descent
English people of Russian-Jewish descent
English rhythm and blues singers
English soul singers
English women guitarists
Golders Green Crematorium
Grammy Award winners
Ivor Novello Award winners
Jewish English musicians
Jewish jazz musicians
Jewish women singers
Jewish songwriters
MTV Europe Music Award winners
National Youth Jazz Orchestra members
Neo soul singers
People educated at the BRIT School
People educated at Susi Earnshaw Theatre School
People from the London Borough of Camden
People from Southgate, London
People with bipolar disorder
Republic Records artists
Singers from London
Third British Invasion artists
World Music Awards winners